Ji'an railway station is a railway station located in Ji'an Township, Hualien County, Taiwan. It is located on the Taitung line and is operated by the Taiwan Railways Administration.

References

1914 establishments in Taiwan
Railway stations in Hualien County
Railway stations opened in 1914
Railway stations served by Taiwan Railways Administration